An annular solar eclipse occurred on September 11, 1969. A solar eclipse occurs when the Moon passes between Earth and the Sun, thereby totally or partly obscuring the image of the Sun for a viewer on Earth. An annular solar eclipse occurs when the Moon's apparent diameter is smaller than the Sun's, blocking most of the Sun's light and causing the Sun to look like an annulus (ring). An annular eclipse appears as a partial eclipse over a region of the Earth thousands of kilometres wide. Annularity was visible from the Pacific Ocean, Peru, Bolivia and the southwestern tip of Brazilian state Mato Grosso. Places west of the International Date Line witnessed the eclipse on Friday, September 12, 1969.

Related eclipses

Solar eclipses of 1968–1971

Saros 134

Tritos series

Metonic series

Notes

References

1969 9 11
1969 in science
1969 9 11
September 1969 events